The 1828 United States presidential election was the 11th quadrennial presidential election. It was held from Friday, October 31 to Tuesday, December 2, 1828. It featured a repetition of the 1824 election, as President John Quincy Adams of the National Republican Party faced Andrew Jackson of the Democratic Party. Both parties were new organizations, and this was the first presidential election their nominees contested. This election saw the second rematch in presidential history, something that would not occur again until 1840.

With the collapse of the Federalist Party, four members of the Democratic-Republican Party, including Jackson and Adams, had sought the presidency in the 1824 election. Jackson had won a plurality (but not majority) of both the electoral vote and popular vote in the 1824 election, but had lost the contingent election that was held in the House of Representatives. In the aftermath of the election, Jackson's supporters accused Adams and Henry Clay of having reached a "corrupt bargain" in which Clay helped Adams win the contingent election in return for the position of Secretary of State. After the 1824 election, Jackson's supporters immediately began plans for a campaign in 1828, and the Democratic-Republican Party fractured into the National Republican Party and the Democratic Party during Adams's presidency.

The 1828 campaign was marked by large amounts of "mudslinging", as both parties attacked the personal qualities of the opposing party's candidate. Jackson dominated in the South and the West, aided in part by the passage of the Tariff of 1828. With the ongoing expansion of the right to vote to most white men, the election marked a dramatic expansion of the electorate, with 9.5% of Americans casting a vote for president, compared with 3.4% in 1824. Several states transitioned to a popular vote for president, leaving South Carolina and Delaware as the only states in which the legislature chose presidential electors.

The election marked the rise of Jacksonian Democracy and the transition from the First Party System to the Second Party System. Historians debate the significance of the election, with many arguing that it marked the beginning of modern American politics by removing key barriers to voter participation and establishing a stable two-party system. Jackson became the first president whose home state was neither Massachusetts nor Virginia, while Adams was the second to lose re-election, following his father John Adams.

Background
While Andrew Jackson won a plurality of electoral votes and the popular vote in the election of 1824, he lost to John Quincy Adams as the election was deferred to the House of Representatives (by the terms of the Twelfth Amendment to the United States Constitution, a presidential election in which no candidate wins a majority of the electoral vote is decided by a contingent election in the House of Representatives). Henry Clay, unsuccessful candidate and Speaker of the House at the time, despised Jackson, in part due to their fight for Western votes during the election, and he chose to support Adams, which led to Adams being elected president on the first ballot.

A few days after the election, Adams appointed Clay his Secretary of State, a position held by Adams and his three immediate predecessors prior to becoming president. Jackson and his followers promptly accused Clay and Adams of striking a "corrupt bargain," and continued to lambaste the president until the 1828 election.

In 1824, the national Democratic-Republican Party collapsed as national politics became increasingly polarized between supporters of Adams and supporters of Jackson. In a prelude to the presidential election, the Jacksonians bolstered their numbers in Congress in the 1826 Congressional elections, with Jackson ally Andrew Stevenson chosen as the new Speaker of the House of Representatives in 1827 over Adams ally Speaker, John W. Taylor.

Nominations

Jacksonian Party nomination

In October 1825, the Tennessee legislature re-nominated Jackson for president. Congressional opponents of Adams, including former William H. Crawford supporter Martin Van Buren, rallied around Jackson's candidacy. Jackson's supporters called themselves Democrats, and would formally organize as the Democratic Party shortly after his election. In hopes of uniting those opposed to Adams, Jackson ran on a ticket with Calhoun. Calhoun would decline the invitation to join the Democratic Party, however, and instead formed the Nullifier Party after the election; the Nullifiers would remain largely aligned with the Democrats for the next few years, but ultimately broke with Jackson over the issue of states' rights during his first term. No congressional nominating caucus or national convention was held.

Adams' relationship with Vice President John C. Calhoun deteriorated, with Calhoun opposing Clay's appointment as Secretary of State due to his own presidential ambitions. In June 1826, Calhoun gave his support to Jackson for the 1828 election. Calhoun's stance on the removal of Native Americans was not accepted by the Georgian electors who instead voted for William Smith.

Van Buren, who supported Crawford during the 1824 election, supported Jackson during the 1828 election and aided in the selection of Calhoun as vice president in order to prevent DeWitt Clinton, his political enemy, from being selected. Clinton died on February 11, 1828. Van Buren arranged for incidents to divide Calhoun and Adams such as him abstaining from a vote on tariff legislation supported by Adams in order for Calhoun to break the tie by voting against it.

Thomas Ritchie, editor of the Richmond Examiner, was one of the leading supporters of Crawford during the 1824 election and Van Buren convinced him to support Jackson. Van Buren convinced him of an alliance "between the planters of the South and the plain Republicans of the North".

Anti-Jacksonian Party nomination

President Adams and his allies, including Secretary of State Clay and Senator Daniel Webster of Massachusetts, became known as the National Republicans. The National Republicans were significantly less organized than the Democrats, and many party leaders did not embrace the new era of popular campaigning. Adams was re-nominated on the endorsement of state legislatures and partisan rallies. As with the Democrats, no nominating caucus or national convention was held. Adams chose Secretary of the Treasury Richard Rush, a Pennsylvanian known for his protectionist views, as his running mate. Adams, who was personally popular in New England, hoped to assemble a coalition in which Clay attracted Western voters, Rush attracted voters in the middle states, and Webster won over former members of the Federalist Party.

Adams support in New York aligned with the Anti-Masonic Party and Thurlow Weed, his campaign manager in the state, was sympathetic to the anti-masonic movement.

General election

Campaign

The campaign was marked by large amounts of nasty "mudslinging." Jackson's marriage, for example, came in for vicious attack. When Jackson married his wife Rachel in 1791, the couple believed that she was divorced, but the divorce was not yet finalized, so he had to remarry her once the legal papers were complete. In the Adams campaign managers' hands, this became a scandal. Charles Hammond, in his Cincinnati Gazette, asked: "Ought a convicted adulteress and her paramour husband be placed in the highest offices of this free and Christian land?"

Jackson's campaigners fired back by claiming that while serving as minister to Russia, Adams had procured a young girl to serve as a prostitute for Emperor Alexander I. They also stated that Adams had a billiard table in the White House and that he had charged the government for it. (in fact Adams while minister to Russia had employed a young girl as a maid to his wife; the girl had written a letter which had been intercepted by the Russian postal services. Alexander I had been curious to meet the letter writer publicly at court and Adams had done so. The billiard table was Adams' personal property; a bill for repairing it had been accidentally included in the White House expense accounts. Adams also came under attack for having a chess set). Jackson also came under heavy attack as a slave trader who bought and sold slaves and moved them about in defiance of modern standards of morality (he was not attacked for merely owning slaves used in plantation work). The Coffin Handbills attacked Jackson for his courts-martial, execution of deserters and massacres of Indian villages, and also his habit of dueling and that he supposedly fought over 100 duels. In fact Jackson had only fought three duels: in the first both men had fired at each other but made up; in the second duel, Jackson vs John Sevier, it had taken place but only two persons not connected with either party had been slightly injured. The third duel was with Charles Dickinson in which Dickinson was mortally wounded while Jackson was left with a bullet in his chest. A so-called fourth duel between Jackson and Thomas Hart Benton was in fact a frontier brawl which left Jackson badly wounded in the shoulder.

Ezra Stiles Ely attacked Adams' Unitarian beliefs and called for Christians to vote for Jackson.

Jackson avoided articulating issue positions, instead campaigning on his personal qualities and his opposition to Adams. Adams avoided popular campaigning, instead emphasizing his support of specific issues. Adams's praise of internal improvements in Europe, such as "lighthouses of the skies" (observatories), in his first annual message to Congress, and his suggestion that Congress not be "palsied by the will of our constituents" were given attention in and out of the press. John Randolph stated on the floor of the Senate that he "never will be palsied by any power save the constitution, and the will of my constituents." Jackson wrote that a lavish government combined with contempt of the constituents could lead to despotism, if not checked by the "voice of the people."
Modern campaigning was also introduced by Jackson. People kissed babies, had picnics, and started many other traditions during the campaign.

Jefferson's opinion

Thomas Jefferson wrote favorably in response to Jackson in December 1823 and extended an invitation to his estate of Monticello: "I recall with pleasure the remembrance of our joint labors while in the Senate together in times of great trial and of hard battling, battles indeed of words, not of blood, as those you have since fought so much for your own glory & that of your country; with the assurance that my attempts continue undiminished, accept that of my great respect & consideration."

Jefferson wrote of the outcome of the contingent election of 1825 in a letter to William H. Crawford, who had been the nominee of the congressional caucus of Democratic-Republicans, saying that he had hoped to congratulate Crawford on his election to the presidency but "events had not been what we had wished."

In the next election, Jackson's and Adams's supporters saw value in establishing the opinion of Jefferson in regards to their respective candidates and against their opposition. Jefferson died on July 4, 1826 on the same day as his predecessor, John Adams, Adam's father.

A goal of the pro-Adams was to depict Jackson as a "mere military chieftain." Edward Coles recounted that Jefferson told him in a conversation in August 1825 that he feared the popular enthusiasm for Jackson: "It has caused me to doubt more than anything that has occurred since our Revolution." Coles used the opinion of Thomas Gilmer to back himself up; Gilmer said Jefferson told him at Monticello before the election of Adams in 1825, "One might as well make a sailor of a cock, or a soldier of a goose, as a President of Andrew Jackson." Daniel Webster, who was also at Monticello at the time, made the same report. Webster recorded that Jefferson told him in December 1824 that Jackson was a dangerous man unfit for the presidency. Historian Sean Wilentz described Webster's account of the meeting as "not wholly reliable." Biographer Robert V. Remini said that Jefferson "had no great love for Jackson."

Gilmer accused Coles of misrepresentation, in Jefferson's opinion had changed, Gilmer said. Jefferson's son-in-law, former Virginia Governor Thomas Mann Randolph, Jr., said in 1826 that Jefferson had a "strong repugnance" to Henry Clay. Randolph publicly stated that Jefferson became friendly to Jackson's candidacy as early as the summer of 1825, perhaps because of the "corrupt bargain" charge, and thought of Jackson as "an honest, sincere, clear-headed and strong-minded man; of the soundest political principles" and "the only hope left" to reverse the increasing powers assumed by the federal government. Others said the same thing, but Coles could not believe Jefferson's opinion had changed.

In 1827, Virginia Governor William B. Giles released a letter from Jefferson meant to be kept private to Thomas Ritchie's Richmond Enquirer. It was written after Adams's first annual message to Congress and it contained an attack from Jefferson on the incumbent administration. Giles said Jefferson's alarm was with the usurpation of the rights of the states, not with a "military chieftain." Jefferson wrote, "take together the decisions of the federal court, the doctrines of the President, and the misconstructions of the constitutional compact acted on by the legislature of the federal bench, and it is but too evident, that the three ruling branches of that department are in combination to strip their colleagues, the State authorities, of the powers reserved by them, and to exercise themselves all functions foreign and domestic." Of the Federalists, he continued, "But this opens with a vast accession of strength from their younger recruits, who, having nothing in them of the feelings or principles of '76, now look to a single and splendid government of an aristocracy, founded on banking institutions, and moneyed incorporations under the guise and cloak of their favored branches of manufactures, commerce, and navigation, riding and ruling over the plundered plowman and beggared yeomanry." The Jacksonians and states' rights men heralded its publication; the Adams men felt it a symptom of senility. Giles omitted a prior letter of Jefferson's praise of Adams for his role in the embargo of 1808. Thomas Jefferson Randolph soon collected and published Jefferson's correspondence.

Results
All of the states, except for Delaware and South Carolina, selected their electors through a popular vote. The selection of electors began on October 31 with elections in Ohio and Pennsylvania and ended on November 13 with elections in North Carolina. The Electoral College met on December 3.

Adams won the same states that his father had won in the election of 1800 (the New England states, New Jersey, and Delaware) and Maryland, but Jackson won all other states and won the election in a landslide.

The Democratic Party in Georgia was hopelessly divided into two factions (Troup and Clark) at the time. Despite this, both factions nominated Jackson for President, with the election being primarily a test of the strength of these two factions - the Adams electors ran a very poor third, with just 3.21% of the vote. The winning slate, which received a 3,000 vote majority.

Jackson received 50.3% of the vote in states without slavery while he received 72.6% of the vote in states with slavery. He received 200,000 votes in the South and 400,000 votes in the North, but the Three-fifths Compromise, which inflated the South's electoral votes, resulted in him receiving 105 electoral votes from the South and 73 votes from the North.

This was the first election in American history in which the incumbent president lost re-election despite winning a greater share of the popular vote than they did the previous election. This would not happen again until 2020.

This was the last election in which the Democrats won Kentucky until 1856. It is also the only election where Maine, New Hampshire, New Jersey, and Vermont voted for the National Republicans, and the last time that New Hampshire voted against the Democrats until 1856.

It was also the only election in which an electoral vote split occurred in Maine until the election of 2016, the first election in which the winning ticket did not have a north–south balance, and the first election in which two northerners ran against two southerners.

Source (Popular Vote): Dubin, Michael J. United States Presidential Elections, 1788-1860
Source (Electoral Vote): 

(a) The popular vote figures exclude Delaware and South Carolina: both states' electors were chosen by the state legislatures rather than by a popular vote.

(b)  The other vote was from Georgia where two slates pledged to Jackson, representing factions of the party, ran. The winning slate was Jackson with Smith - the Troup Faction - and the other was Jackson with Calhoun - the Clark faction. Many sources combine the vote when reporting the Georgia results, but this is legally incorrect.

Results by state

Close states 

Districts where the margin of victory was under 1%:
NY-20 0.45%
MD-3 0.49%
MD-6 0.65%

States and Districts where the margin of victory was under 5%:
Maine-Cumberland 2.22%
NY-16 2.63%
MD-4 2.67%
NY-8 2.77%
Ohio 3.16%
NY-10 3.34%
NY-1 3.85%
New Jersey 4.02%
MD-7 4.04%
NY-13 4.19%
NY-9 4.34%

States and Districts where the margin of victory was under 10%:
NY-19 5.65%
NY-23 5.81%
Maine-Oxford 5.90%
Louisiana 6.07%
NY-14 6.22%
New Hampshire 6.48%
NY-4 9.15%
NY-22 9.20%
NY-17 9.51%
NY-28 9.77%

John Quincy Adams received a similar number of electoral college votes in 1824 and 1828.

 a Stated total was 1,993
 b Stated total was 4,448
 c There were two Jackson tickets in Georgia representing different factions of the party. The Troup faction "won" with 9,712 votes and the Clarke faction lost with 7,991. They are combined here, though legally this is incorrect. The state rejected returns from 10 counties and 8 others submitted none. Including the rejected returns, the total votes are Jackson (Troup) 10,508, Jackson (Clarke) 8,854 and Adams, 642.
 d  Stated total was 13,927
 e  In Maryland's 3rd and 4th districts, voters voted for two electors, with each pledged to one candidate or another. The votes in the 3rd were 6,177 for William Fitzhugh, Jr. and 6,164 for William Tyler, both for Jackson, versus 6,117 for George Baltzell and William Price for Adams. In the 4th the votes were 6,058 for Benjamin Chew Howard and James Sewell for Jackson versus 5,743 and 5,742 for the Adams electors. [Note: Dubin mistakenly swapped the 3rd and 4th districts in his book, but that has been corrected here]. 
 f Stated total was 29,836
 g Stated total was 7,088
 h Two statewide electors were chosen by the electors elected at the district level.

Aftermath 
Rachel Jackson had been having chest pains throughout the campaign, and she was traumatized by the personal attacks on her marriage. She became ill and died on December 22, 1828. Jackson accused the Adams campaign, and Henry Clay even more so, of causing her death, saying, "I can and do forgive all my enemies. But those vile wretches who have slandered her must look to God for mercy."

Andrew Jackson was sworn in as president on March 4, 1829. After the inauguration, a mob entered the White House to shake the new president's hand, damaging the furniture and lights. Jackson escaped through the back, and large punch bowls were set up to lure the crowd outside. Conservatives were horrified at this event, and held it up as a portent of terrible things to come from the first Democratic president. When Jackson arrived in Washington D.C., he was to pay the customary courtesy call on the outgoing president, but he refused to do so. John Quincy Adams responded by refusing to go to the inauguration of Andrew Jackson, similar to his father who did not attend the inauguration of Thomas Jefferson 28 years before. While Jackson did not hold John Quincy Adams among those who had slandered Rachel Jackson, social relations between the two men were cold and impersonal: for example, when Adams heard from a third party that Jackson would invite him to a social dinner he responded that Jackson should send the invitation personally.  In his diary Adams also revealed his disgust that not only was his Alma Mater Harvard College was going to award Jackson an honorary Doctor of Law degree (Jackson had not gone to study law in college but had learned law as a law clerk to a Judge) but that they were doing to do so to a "barbarian" [i.e., someone who had not studied the classical languages of Latin and Greek].

Electoral College selection

See also 
 First inauguration of Andrew Jackson
 History of the United States (1789–1849)
 Jacksonian democracy
 1828–29 United States House of Representatives elections
 1828–29 United States Senate elections

References

Bibliography 
 
 
 
 
  excerpt and text search
 
 
 
  examines the campaign literature of 1828
 
  excerpt and text search

Further reading

External links 

 Presidential Election of 1828: A Resource Guide from the Library of Congress
 Historian James Parton describes election
 The 1828 Campaign of Andrew Jackson and the Growth of Party Politics
 Election of 1828 in Counting the Votes 

 
Presidency of Andrew Jackson
Andrew Jackson
John Quincy Adams
John C. Calhoun